National Highway 381, commonly referred to as NH 381, is a national highway of India. It is a spur road of National Highway 81. NH-381 traverses the state of Tamil Nadu in India.

Route
It starts from NH 81 near Avinashipalayam and terminates at NH 544 near Avinashi. This highway passes through the city of Tiruppur.

Junctions  

  Terminal near Avinashipalayam.
  Terminal near Avinashi.

See also 
 List of National Highways in India
 List of National Highways in India by state

References

External links 
NH 381 on OpenStreetMap

National highways in India
National Highways in Tamil Nadu